Jens Peter Hammerich, better known as Rumle Hammerich (born 16 November 1954), is a Danish film director, screenwriter and film company director. He is currently creative director at Nordisk Film.

His filmography consists of both feature films and television films and mini series in Denmark as well as Sweden. His mini series Young Andersen—which describes the formative boarding school years of Hans Christian Andersen— won an Emmy Award for Best international TV Movie/Mini Series in 2005. His crime series The Protectors won the 2009 International Emmy Award for the best television drama series.

Biography 
Jens Peter Hammerich was born on 16 November 1954 in Copenhagen to translator Ida Elisabeth Hammerich and Paul Hammerich, journalist, writer and editor in chief at the national Danish newspaper Politiken. From an early age he was called Rumle and when his father in 1959 asked her mother to translate Charles M. Schulz's comic strip Peanuts for Politiken, she gave the perpetually dirty boy Pig-Pen her son's nickname.

He graduated from the National Film School of Denmark in 1979, and had his debut as a feature film director in 1983 with the children film Otto er et næsehorn "Otto Is a Rhino". After working in Sweden in the early 1990s, directing films such as the horror film Svart Lucia and the children film Kan du vissla Johanna?, he was made the director of national Danish television station DR's fiction department in 1994. In 1998 he left DR and the following year he joined Nordisk Film, where he led the subsidiary Nordisk Film Produktion until 2003 when he was made creative director of the company.

Filmography

Directing

Feature films 
 Otto er et næsehorn (1983)
 The Dog That Smiled (1989)
 Svart Lucia (1992)
 Headhunter (2009)

TV series and film 
 Dårfinkar & dönickar, TV series (3 episodes, 1988–90)
 Fasadklättraren, TV (1991)
 Lærerværelset, TV (6 episodes, 1994)
 Kan du vissla Johanna?, TV (1994)
 Taxa, TV series (2 episodes, 1997)
 Herr von Hancken, mini series (2000)
 Young Andersen, mini series (2005)
 The Bridge (2011 TV series), series 4, 2018

Documentaries 
 Cliff Forrest, documentary (2007)

Producing

Feature films 
 Once in a Lifetime, executive producer (2000)
 I Am Dina, associate producer (2002)
 Suxxess, co-producer (2002)
 Lykkevej, executive producer (2003)
 En som Hodder, executive producer  (2003)
 Strings, creative producer (2004)

TV series 
 Taxa, executive producer (1997)
 Leif Panduro, executive producer (1998)
 Rundt om Panduro, executive producer (1998)
 Beck, executive producer (1 episode, 2002)
 Forsvar, executive producer (2003)

Documentaries 
 Facing the Truth, executive producer (2002)
 Cliff Forrest (2007)

Screenwriting

Feature films 
 Den Sidste detalje (1981)
 Cirkus Casablanca (1981)
 Otto er et næsehorn (1983)
 Skyggen af Emma (1988)
 Svart Lucia (1992)
 Headhunter (2009)

TV series and films 
 Quark and the Vikings, story (1987)
 Fasadklättraren, TV (1991)
 Satirica, TV series (1993)
 Mellem venner, idea (1995)
 Rejseholdet, co-writer (2000)
 Young Andersen (2005)

References 

1954 births
Living people
Danish film directors
Danish film producers
Danish male screenwriters
People from Copenhagen